Celliphine Chepteek Chespol (born March 23, 1999) is a Kenyan track and field athlete, specialising in steeplechase running. Since she was 18 years 64 days old, it was also the world junior record. The race is more impressive since she lost her shoe at the water jump with more than a lap to go during the race. Later in the year, she represented Kenya at the 2017 World Championships, running with the breakaway lead pack until the last two laps, ultimately finishing in sixth place just behind the world record holder Ruth Jebet.

Previously she was the 2015 world youth champion and the 2016 world junior champion.  IAAF has reported two different birthdates for her, March 23, 1999 in her athlete profile and June 22, 1998 in her Diamond League profile.  If the 1999 birthdate is accurate, her 9:25.15 at the 2016 race would be a world youth best.  Earlier in 2017, she finished third in the 2017 World Cross Country Championships Junior race, leading Kenya to the team silver medal, one point behind Ethiopia.

External links

References

Living people
1999 births
Kenyan female steeplechase runners
Kenyan female cross country runners
Commonwealth Games medallists in athletics
Commonwealth Games silver medallists for Kenya
Athletes (track and field) at the 2018 Commonwealth Games
World Athletics Championships athletes for Kenya
World Athletics U20 Championships winners
African Cross Country Championships winners
Medallists at the 2018 Commonwealth Games